Maxime Gremetz (born September 3, 1940 in Canchy, Somme) was a member of the National Assembly of France.  He represented the Somme's 1st constituency,  and is a member of the French Communist Party and Gauche démocrate et républicaine. According to Michel Foucault Gremetz's response to the  Polish Communist government's outlawing of Solidarity was to declare that the ban was necessary to avoid civil war.

References

1940 births
Living people
People from Somme (department)
Politicians from Hauts-de-France
French Communist Party politicians
Deputies of the 6th National Assembly of the French Fifth Republic
Deputies of the 8th National Assembly of the French Fifth Republic
Deputies of the 10th National Assembly of the French Fifth Republic
Deputies of the 11th National Assembly of the French Fifth Republic
Deputies of the 12th National Assembly of the French Fifth Republic
Deputies of the 13th National Assembly of the French Fifth Republic